Hilmer Motorsport was a German racing team established in 2013 by Franz Hilmer. The team first raced in the GP2 Series, starting in 2013, replacing Ocean Racing Technology.

Hilmer joined the GP3 Series in 2014 with support from Force India, replacing the Russian Time entry after the outfit pulled out after the death of founder Igor Mazepa in February 2014.

Results

GP2 Series

In detail
(key) (Races in bold indicate pole position) (Races in italics indicate fastest lap)

GP3 Series

In detail
(key) (Races in bold indicate pole position) (Races in italics indicate fastest lap)

Notes

References

External links
 
 

German auto racing teams
GP2 Series teams
GP3 Series teams
Auto racing teams established in 2013
2013 establishments in Germany
Auto racing teams disestablished in 2018